, known mononymously as Ai (stylized as AI or A.I. ), is a Japanese-American singer-songwriter, rapper, record producer, spokeswoman, and actress. Born in Los Angeles, California, Ai moved to Kagoshima, at age 4. Motivated to become a singer, Ai returned to Los Angeles, attending the Los Angeles County High School for the Arts. While in Los Angeles, Ai began her musical career performing as part of a gospel choir at a Mary J. Blige concert and as a dancer for Janet Jackson's music video, "Go Deep". She briefly joined the Asian girl group SX4 in 1999 until she graduated high school.

After being discovered by BMG in 2000, Ai relocated to Japan and released her debut album, My Name is Ai (2001), to very little commercial success. Signing to Def Jam Records Japan in 2002, Ai became the first woman signed to the label. She released two studio albums under the label, Original Ai (2003) and 2004 Ai. With the release of her third studio album, Ai rose to mainstream prominence in Japan. Signing to Island Records, Ai released her fourth studio album, Mic-a-Holic Ai in 2005. Its second single "Story" became one of the biggest singles of the 2000s in Japan, peaking at number 8 on the Japanese Oricon singles chart, and was the sixth single in history to receive a triple million digital certification by the Recording Industry Association of Japan (RIAJ).

Ai's fifth studio album, What's Goin' On Ai (2006), featured the top-ten singles "Believe" and "I Wanna Know", the latter receiving a Gold certification from the RIAJ. Her sixth studio album, Don't Stop Ai (2007) saw similar success, which received a Gold certification. In 2009, she released her seventh studio album, Viva Ai, which charted in the top ten of the Japanese Oricon albums chart. Ai's compilation album, Best Ai (2009), became her first number one album and was certified Platinum. In 2010, she released her eighth studio album, The Last Ai, which marked her last release under Island Records.

In 2011, Ai left Universal Music Group and signed a global publishing deal with EMI. Her Gold certified ninth studio album Independent (2012) served as her international debut and first release under EMI Music Japan. To promote the album, Ai toured in Japan and her hometown, Los Angeles, California. Her tenth studio album Moriagaro (2013) marked her first release under EMI Records Japan following EMI Music Japan's absorption into Universal Music Japan as a sublabel. Her fourth compilation album, The Best (2015) peaked at number 3 on the Oricon Albums chart and number 2 on the Billboard Japan Hot Albums chart, later being certified Gold by the RIAJ. Its successor, The Feat. Best (2016) charted within the top 30 of both the Japan Hot Albums and Oricon Albums chart.

Ai's eleventh studio album, Wa to Yo (2017) experimented with traditional Japanese and electronic sounds. Its second single, "Kira Kira" was nominated for the Grand Prix award and won the Excellent Works Award at the 59th Japan Records Awards. Her sixth compilation album Kansha!!!!! - Thank You for 20 Years New and Best (2019) was issued to celebrate her twenty years in the music industry. Further celebrating her twenty-year anniversary, Ai released the extended plays It's All Me, Vol. 1 (2020) and It's All Me, Vol. 2 (2021). In December 2021, Ai announced her twelfth studio album, Dream. The album was released in February 2022.

Life and career

1981–1997: Early life and education 
Ai was born in Los Angeles in 1981. Her father is Japanese and her mother is American of Italian and Native Okinawan descent. She moved to Kagoshima in Japan when she was 4, and went to elementary school and junior high school in Japan.

Ai was motivated to become a singer in her early teens, after singing at a cousin's wedding, having many people ask her if she wanted to be a professional singer, and hearing a gospel performance at the First African Methodist Episcopal Church of Los Angeles in 1993. After graduating from junior high school in Japan, Ai returned to Los Angeles for high school, enrolling at Glendale High School, however found high school difficult due to never formally studying English. After making it through the audition process, she switched to the Los Angeles County High School for the Arts, majoring in ballet. She became a member of the school's gospel choir.

1998–1999: Career beginnings 
While attending Los Angeles County High School for the Arts, Ai began her musical career by performing in a gospel choir at a Mary J. Blige concert at the Universal Amphitheatre, performing of "A Dream". In the same year, she appeared as a dancer in the music video for Janet Jackson's song "Go Deep". In 1999, Ai joined an Asian girl group called SX4, who were produced by George Brown of Kool & the Gang. Later in 1999, the group was offered a record label deal.

2000–2004: Relocation to Japan 
While on a summer holiday in Kagoshima, Ai performed Monica's "For You I Will" on a local radio station, which led to her being scouted by BMG. She decided to take the offer, and after leaving SX4 and graduating from high school in June 2000, moved to Tokyo and debuted as a musician later in 2000.

Ai debuted under BMG Japan sublabel RCA Records with the single "Cry, Just Cry" in November 2000. Two additional singles were released, "U Can Do" and "Shining Star". Although the latter failed to chart, "Shining Star" charted and peaked at number 98 on the Oricon singles chart. Eventually, her debut studio album, My Name Is Ai was released in November 2001. Although not commercially successful, the album peaked at number 86 on the Oricon albums chart.

In 2002 Ai moved to Def Jam Japan and became the first female artist signed to the label. Ai claimed that she felt more at home under Def Jam, as many of her co-workers shared her musical tastes. Her first album under the label in 2003 Original Ai debuted at 15 on Oricon'''s album charts, and her second, 2004 Ai, debuted at number three. In 2004, she won the Space Shower Music Video Awards' award for Best R&B Video, with her song "Thank U".

After moving to Def Jam, Ai increasingly began collaborating with musicians, especially Japanese hip-hop and rap artists (though under BMG, Ai had collaborated with Mao Denda, and Soul'd Out rapper Diggy-Mo'). She was featured as a rapper on the Suite Chic single "Uh Uh,,,,,", a collaboration between Namie Amuro, Verbal of M-Flo, and music producer Ryōsuke Imai in 2003. Other musicians Ai collaborated with in this period were Afra, Boy-Ken, Joe Budden, Dabo, Deli, Double, Heartsdales, Ken Hirai, M-Flo, Sphere of Influence and Zeebra. Towards the end of 2004, Ai's former label BMG released a compilation album titled Flashback to Ai. The compilation featured songs originally recorded for her debut studio album. Soon after, Ai left Def Jam Japan and signed to Island Records and Universal Sigma. The label released a compilation titled Feat. Ai of songs that have her as a featured artist.

 2005–2010: "Story", rise in fame 

In 2005, Ai released the ballad single "Story", which became the biggest hit of her career. A sleeper hit, the song charted for 20 weeks in the top 30 in 2005 and 2006 and went on to sell over three million ringtones, one million cellphone downloads, and 270,000 physical copies. Ai later performed "Story" at the prestigious 56th NHK Kōhaku Uta Gassen New Years music concert. Her next studio album, Mic-a-holic Ai, was the best selling album of her career, being certified double Platinum by the RIAJ.

Ai's first single of 2006, the ballad "Believe", was also a success: it debuted at number two, and sold more than one million ringtones. The song was used as the theme song of the Kenji Sakaguchi starring medical drama, Team Medical Dragon. Her next two albums, What's Goin' On Ai (2006) and Don't Stop Ai (2007) were also greatly commercially successful, being certified Platinum and Gold respectively. In 2007, Ai made her debut performance in the United States at the El Ray Theatre with an audience around 800. In 2008, Ai returned to Los Angeles for her Ai Loves LA concert at the Redondo Beach Performing Arts Center. The performance was a benefit concert for the Go For Broke National Education Center, an organization that commemorates Japanese Americans who served in the United States Army during World War II.

In 2009, Ai released her seventh studio album Viva Ai, which charted in the top ten of the Japanese Oricon albums chart. Her greatest hits album, Best Ai was released the same year. Best Ai later became Ai's first album to top the Oricon Albums chart. Ai debuted as a film director in August 2009 with her short film, Take Action, which was recorded in Los Angeles. Alongside Anna Tsuchiya and Micro, Ai also directed the drama film, Blue Pacific Stories. Later that year, Ai performed "Okuribito" and "Story" at the 3rd Asia Pacific Screen Awards which was held in Gold Coast, Australia.

In 2010, Ai collaborated with many artists such as Namie Amuro, Miliyah Kato, Chaka Khan and Boyz II Men on her 10th anniversary album, The Last Ai. Both Ai and Khan won the International Collaboration Artists of the Year at the 2010 Billboard Japan Music Awards for the song "One More Try" and a cover of Khan's "Through the Fire".

 2011–2016: Independent, Moriagaro and The Best 

In June 2011, Ai signed a global publishing deal with EMI and a record deal with EMI Music Japan. She collaborated with The Jacksons on December 13 and 14, 2011, at the Michael Jackson Tribute Live tribute concerts held in Tokyo. She performed the vocals in the third act for Michael Jackson's songs. She also performed and released the theme song for the event, "Letter in the Sky" featuring the Jacksons. In November 2011, Ai released the song "Happiness", a collaboration with Coca-Cola for their winter 2011 campaign. The song was a hit, being certified Gold in two different mediums. The song revitalized the sales of her ninth studio album, Independent, which has sold more than 60,000 copies. Independent was Ai's first album to be released internationally outside of Asia. In promotion of the album, Ai embarked on the Independent Tour 2012. The tour included a performance at Club Nokia in Los Angeles. In the same year, Ai announced she was working on her US debut album. One song, a remix of Diggy Simmons song "Put You On" featuring Chris Brown and Diggy Simmons himself was released, however the album was never released.

On April 1, 2013, EMI Music Japan was completely merged into Universal Music Japan as a sublabel by the name of EMI Records Japan as a result of Universal Music's purchase of EMI in September 2012. Ai's tenth studio album, Moriagaro, was released in July 2013, serving as her first release under EMI Japan, although was not released outside of Asia. Its lead single "Voice" peaked at number 2 on the Billboard Japan Hot 100 and was certified Platinum. Later that year, Ai performed "Story" in collaboration with figure skater and two-time Olympic champion Yuzuru Hanyu at the touring ice show Fantasy on Ice amongst others. In 2014, Ai was transferred to EMI Records after EMI Japan was split and rebranded. A previously unreleased English version of Ai's single "Story" was featured in the Japanese dub of the Disney film Big Hero 6 in October 2014. 

In January 2015, Ai recorded the song "Off Love" for Spicy Chocolate and Sly and Robbie's Grammy-nominated album, The Reggae Power. In November 2015, Ai released a compilation album, The Best, to celebrate fifteen years in the music industry. The compilation album was reissued in mid-2016. In 2016, Ai signed with Def Jam Recordings in partnership with EMI Records. She later released "Minna ga Minna ga Eiyū", which became a sleeper hit, peaking at number 4 on the Billboard Japan Hot 100. The original 100-second version of the song was certified Platinum while the full version was certified Gold. A third compilation release of tracks with featured artists titled The Feat. Best was issued in November 2016. In promotion of these compilation releases, Ai embarked on The Best Tour.

 2017–present: Wa to Yo, twenty-year anniversary and Dream 
Ai teased her eleventh studio album, Wa to Yo on social media in April 2017. Wanting to "convey the goodness of Japan" to the rest of the world and "the goodness of the overseas to Japanese people", Ai collaborated with several producers, artists and songwriters from both Japan and the west. The lead single "Justice Will Prevail at Last" was released in May 2017. Wa to Yo was released in June 2017 and was her second international album release outside of Asia. The album was reissued in October 2017, titled Wa to Yo to. The album peaked at number 11 on the Oricon weekly chart.

In early 2019, Ai traveled to her hometown, Los Angeles, California, to record new material to celebrate twenty years in the music industry and for the 2020 Tokyo Summer Olympics. Her fourth compilation album, Kansha!!!!! - Thank You for 20 Years New and Best, was released in November 2019, serving as her first international compilation release. In April 2020, Ai was revealed to be one of the artists performing for Global Citizen's Together At Home concert. Performing various songs from her discography, Ai was the first and only artist in Japan to participate in the event. In June 2020, Ai's extended play, It's All Me, Vol. 1 was announced and originally was planned to be released on the start of the 2020 Olympics, but instead was released on July 8, 2020, after the event was postponed to summer 2021 due to the COVID-19 pandemic. The lead single of It's All Me, Vol. 1, "Summer Magic" was her second single to be released internationally. Its Japanese version was included in an advertisement for the Amazon Echo.

In November 2020, "Not So Different" was released digitally as the lead single for Ai's extended play, It's All Me, Vol. 2. In December 2020, Ai partnered with One Young World and released a special music video of the song in support of the project. A remix of "Not So Different" featuring Japanese rapper Awich was released on December 11, 2020, as a promotional single. A promotional single, "Hope" was released on January 30, 2021, with its music video premiering the same day. Ai partnered with deleteC, a non-profit organization in Japan aiming to support cancer treatment. It's All Me, Vol. 2 later was released in February 2021. In March 2021, EMI released a compilation EP of songs by Ai titled Self Selection "Hip Hop". In June 2021, Ai's previous releases with Def Jam Japan, Universal Sigma and Island Records were made available internationally for digital streaming.

On June 28, 2021, Ai released "The Moment" featuring Japanese rapper Yellow Bucks. On the same day, she performed the song with Yellow Bucks and DJ Ryow on CDTV, a Japanese TV channel by TBS. In August 2021, she released a single featuring Dachi Miura, titled "In the Middle". In September 2021, Ai announced her next single, "Aldebaran". The song serves as the theme song for the NHK television drama, Come Come Everybody. Upon its release in November, it became her first charting single on the Billboard Japan Hot 100 since her 2017 single, "Kira Kira". The song debuted and peaked at number 37 on the chart. On the Oricon charts, "Aldebaran" peaked at number 4 on the Daily Digital Singles Chart and number 6 on the weekly Digital Singles Chart. Ai performed "Aldebaran" at the 72nd NHK Kōhaku Uta Gassen on December 31, 2021, her fourth appearance on the show. In December 2021, Ai announced her twelfth studio album on social media, Dream. The nine-track album was released in February 2022. A tour titled after the album began on May 14, 2022 until December. In April 2022, Ai was featured on the front cover of Music Magazine. In May 2022, "Aldebaran" won the Best Drama Song award at the 111th Television Drama Academy Awards.

 Artistry 
 Influences 

Ai's earliest musical influence was gospel music, which she discovered when her mother's friend took her to a gospel church during junior high school. In an interview with Vogue, Ai stated Michael Jackson is one of her biggest musical influences. Dr. Dre, Snoop Dogg, Janet Jackson, Puff Daddy, Usher, Mary. J. Blige, Tupac Shakur, and Whitney Houston have also heavily influenced Ai while she was a teenager.

 Musical styles 
Ai's discography spans R&B, hip hop, pop, J-pop, and dance genres. Critics have compared her to Beyoncé, Alicia Keys, and Missy Elliott. The Los Angeles Times has described Ai as a "fast-rising diva with authentic American-sounding R&B". While her early works are primarily marketed as R&B, her ninth and tenth studio albums, Independent and Moriagaro experimented with dance-pop. Ai's eleventh studio album Wa to Yo experimented with traditional Japanese and electropop sounds, while also featuring a return to her early R&B sound. Her 2019 greatest hits album Kansha!!!!! - Thank You for 20 Years New and Best heavily featured gospel influences. Ai's twelfth studio album Dream has been described as a pop and R&B album with influence from hip hop and gospel music.

Other ventures
In April 2011, Ai presented a music documentary, Ai Miss Michael Jackson: King of Pop no Kiseki, that was recorded for Music On! TV. In the documentary, she traveled to the United States and interviewed members of the Jackson family in their home.

For the American musical comedy Glee's season two episode "Britney/Brittany", Ai dubbed the voice of Britney Spears in the Japanese release.

 Products and endorsements 
As is standard for Japanese musicians, Ai has featured as a spokesman, or has her music featured, for many products. Ai's songs have been used as TV commercial songs, drama theme songs, film theme songs and TV show ending theme songs.

Ai has worked on four major Coca-Cola TV commercial campaigns, two featuring her own songs ("You Are My Star" (2009), "Happiness" (2011)) and two featuring collaborations (K'naan's "Wavin' Flag" (2009), Namie Amuro's "Wonder Woman" (2011)). She has also been featured in two Audio-Technica campaigns (using "My Friend (Live Version)" and "I'll Remember You", a campaign for Japan Airlines ("Brand New Day") and Pepsi Nex with "I Wanna Know".

Ai's most high-profile work for a TV drama was the theme song for 2006's primetime drama Team Medical Dragon, "Believe", which was one of her greatest hits, selling over one million ringtones. Ai also sung the theme song for the drama's second series, "One". Ai also worked on the theme song for the 2010 primetime drama Keishichō Keizoku Sōsahan, "Nemurenai Machi". Other program theme songs include the Japanese theme song for the American drama Heroes ("Taisetsu na Mono"), and the 15th ending theme for the children's animation Crayon Shin-chan, "Crayon Beats"). In 2005, Ai's song "Alive (English Version)" was used as an insert song for the South Korean drama Delightful Girl Choon-Hyang.

Many of Ai's songs have been used in films. Her "Story" song was remade (also with its English version) for Disney's box office Big Hero 6 in 2014. She performed the theme song for Departures (2008), the winner of the Academy Award for Best Foreign Language Film in 2009. She has also sung the theme songs for Crayon Shin-chan: The Legend Called Buri Buri 3 Minutes Charge (2005), Pray (2005), Lalapipo (2009) and Berserk Golden Age Arc I: The Egg of the High King (2012). Her music has been featured on the soundtracks of TKO Hiphop (2005), the musical film Memories of Matsuko (2006), in which Ai cameoed to perform the song, and Heat Island (2007).

 Legacy 

In Japan, Ai has earned the nickname "Queen of hip-hop soul".

With her management company The Mic-a-holics, Ai helped launch the careers of many Japanese acts, including Japanese singer Riri. In 2012, The Independent listed Ai as the next big thing in Asian pop.

Personal life
On March 6, 2013, Ai announced her engagement to Hiro, the leader and vocalist of the rock band Kaikigesshoku. The pair had been dating for 10 years, and wed in January 2014. On August 28, 2015, Ai gave birth to her first child, a baby girl. On July 24, 2018, it was revealed Ai was pregnant with her second child. Her second child, a boy, was born on December 29, 2018.

In 2019, outdoor advertisements for Ai's single, "Summer Magic" were displayed at Shinjuku Station. The advertisement displayed a search result of her name, which showed top results for artificial intelligence (AI), while a cut off photo of Ai herself appeared on the bottom of the search result. On Twitter, Ai revealed her distaste of artificial intelligence being the top results when searching her name mononymously on search engines.

 Controversy 
In 2012, Ai was part of a controversy regarding the murder of Nicola Furlong. Reports from The Japan Times and Irish Independent stated James Blackston and Richard Hinds were working for Ai as performers for her Independent Tour 2012. On May 21, a day after the tour performance in Sendai, Blackston was at a dance school within the city teaching dance moves for a number of Ai songs to students. Regarding allegations of a connection to the crime, Ai and her representative team declined to make an official statement.

 Discography 

 My Name Is Ai (2001)
 Original Ai (2003)
 2004 Ai (2004)
 Mic-a-holic Ai (2005)
 What's Goin' On Ai (2006)
 Don't Stop Ai (2007)
 Viva Ai (2009)
 The Last Ai (2010)
 Independent (2012)
 Moriagaro (2013)
 Wa to Yo (2017)Dream'' (2022)

Filmography

Film

Television

Director

Awards and nominations

References

External links 

 Official website

Ai on Twitter
Ai on Instagram
 
 
Ai on YouTube
 

 
1981 births
Living people
21st-century American women singers
21st-century American singers
21st-century Japanese women singers
21st-century American actresses
21st-century women rappers
21st-century Japanese singers
21st-century American rappers
21st-century Japanese actresses
People from Los Angeles
Singers from Los Angeles
Songwriters from California
People from Kagoshima
Musicians from Kagoshima Prefecture
Los Angeles County High School for the Arts alumni
Actresses from Los Angeles
American people of Italian descent
Japanese people of American descent
Japanese people of Italian descent
American musicians of Japanese descent
American women songwriters
American women pop singers
Japanese women pop singers
American hip hop singers
Japanese hip hop singers
American contemporary R&B singers
Record producers from Los Angeles
Japanese rhythm and blues singers
English-language singers from Japan
Bertelsmann Music Group artists
RCA Records artists
Universal Music Group artists
Universal Music Japan artists
Def Jam Recordings artists
Island Records artists
EMI Music Japan artists
EMI Records artists
American expatriates in Japan
Citizens of Japan through descent
Japanese women singer-songwriters
American women singer-songwriters
American rappers of Asian descent
American women rappers
Japanese rappers
Pop rappers
Women hip hop record producers
American hip hop record producers
American women record producers
Japanese women record producers
Spokespersons
Fantasy on Ice guest artists